Vvedensky (masculine), Vvedenskaya (feminine), or Vvedenskoye (neuter) may refer to:
Vvedensky (surname) (Vvedenskaya), Russian last name
Vvedensky Municipal Okrug, a municipal okrug in Petrogradsky District of the federal city of St. Petersburg, Russia
Vvedensky (rural locality) (Vvedenskaya, Vvedenskoye), several rural localities in Russia

See also
Vedensky (disambiguation)